The Sonsorolese language is a Micronesian language spoken in Palau, originally on the islands composing the state of Sonsorol, and spreading through migration elsewhere in the country. It is very close to Tobian.

Introduction

History
Sonsorolese is mostly spoken in the Palau archipelago, particularly in Sonsorol, Pulo Ana, and the Merir Islands. It is one of two indigenous languages spoken in the area.

Population
There are about 360 speakers spread out across 60 islands. Most speakers of Sonsorol are bilingual, with their second language being English. The language is an official language for the areas where it is spoken. It is usually used for the state's internal communications, like announcements and invitations. Some closely related languages of Sonsorol are Ulithian, Woleaian, and Satawalese. The language is part of the Austronesian language family. Most of the population have migrated from the islands of the Sonsorol state to Palau's main town, Koror and Echang village. The reasons are various, including economic and environmental. Young Sonsorolese speakers use a mixture of Palauan, English and Sonsorolese, what is called Echangese and is different from what the elder generation speaks. There are currently less than 20 speakers over 60 years old.

Geographic distribution 
Northern Mariana Islands: unknown (immigrant language)
Palau: 600 speakers
Sonsorol: 60 speakers+
Merir: 5 speakers+
 Pulo Anna: 25 speakers+
 Sonsorol: 29 speakers+
 Rest of the country: 540 speakers

Dialects 
 Pulo-Anan
 Sonsorolese

Phonology

Consonants
In Sonsorolese, there are 19 consonants.

Vowels

Voiceless vowels
Voiceless vowels occur in three contexts: “as finals, after a consonant, after a full, generally long vowel, and before a consonant, when they are acoustically similar to falling diphthongs, after non-final consonants a furtive /i/ or /u/ produces palatalization or velarisation (respectively) of the consonants".

Orthography and pronunciation
Sonsorolese is primarily a spoken language. Many of the sounds are like those in Tobian and Woleaian. As in Woleaian, voiceless vowels are usually found at the end of Sonsorolese words. For example, in Dongosaro, the native name for Sonsorol island, the final -o is voiceless.

Written documents in Sonsorolese include the Constitution of Sonsorol State and certain parts of the Bible. However, there seems to be a confusion regarding the Bible since there seems not to be a distinction between Tobian and Sonsorolese. 

 a – [a]
 ae – [ae]
 ai – [ai]
 ao – [ao]
 au – [au]
 b – [b]
 c – [c]
 d – [d/ð]
 e – [e]
 f – [f]
 g – [g/ɣ]
 h – [x]
 i – [i]
 k – [k]
 l – [ʟʲ]
 m – [m]
 n – [n]
 ng – [ŋ]
 o – [o]
 p – [p]
 r – [r]
 s – [s]
 t – [t]
 u – [u]
 v – [v]
 w – [w]
 y – [j]

Grammar

Reduplication
There is full reduplication in the Sonsorol language. E.g. 'orange' = , 'oranges' = .

Numerals
The numeral system of Sonsorolese is base-10. The numeral system can go up to 1,000, which is "da ngaladi".

 "one"
 "two"
 "three"
 "four"
 "five"
 "six"
 "seven"
 "eight"
 "nine"
 "ten"
 "twenty"

Vocabulary

: "what?"
: "dangerous"
: "cold"
: "I don't speak Sonsorolese"
: "apple"
: "banana"
: "betel nut"
: "bread"
: "chicken"
: "coconut"
: "egg"
: "fish"
: "ice"
: "taro"
: "land crab"
: "papaya"
: "pork"
: "rice"
: "come"

References

Further reading
Capell, A. (1969). Grammar and Vocabulary of the Language of Sonsorol – Tobi. Sydney: University Of Sydney.
Ethnologue, (2014). Sonsorol. [online] Available at: https://www.ethnologue.com/language/sov 
Isles-of-the-sea.org. (2014). Sonsorol | isles of the sea bible translation. http://isles-of-the-sea.org/projects/sonsorol/.
Palaunet.com. (2014). Culture of Palau. [online] Retrieved from: http://www.palaunet.com/pw_culture.aspx
The Joshua Project:. Sonsorol in Palau ethnic people profile. [online] Retrieved from: http://www.joshuaproject.net/people-profile.php?rog3=PS&peo3=14999 
Sonsorol.com. (2014).
Sonsorol-island.blogspot.com. (2014).
Wals.info, (2014). WALS Online – Language Sonsorol-Tobi. Available at: http://wals.info/languoid/lect/wals_code_son

External links
 Language page at Sonsorol.com
 Recordings of lexical items, paradigms and narratives archived with Kaipuleohone
 OLAC resources in and about the Sonsorol language

Chuukic languages
Languages of Palau
Sonsorol
Endangered Austronesian languages
Severely endangered languages